Serianthes myriadenia is a species of flowering plant in the family Fabaceae. It is found only in French Polynesia.

References

myriandenia
Flora of French Polynesia
Near threatened plants
Taxonomy articles created by Polbot